The Jew's House is one of the earliest extant town houses in England, estimated to have been built around 1170.  It is situated on Steep Hill in Lincoln, immediately below Jew's Court. The house has traditionally been associated with the thriving Jewish community in Medieval Lincoln.  Antisemitic hysteria was stoked by a notorious 1255 blood libel alleging that the mysterious death of a Christian child, known as Little Saint Hugh of Lincoln, was the result of him being kidnapped and ritually killed by Jews. In 1290, the entire Jewish community was expelled from England by Edward I, and the Jew's House is said to have been seized from a Jewish owner. The building has remained continuously occupied to the present day. Since about 1973 it has been used as a restaurant; prior to that it had been an antiques shop for many years.

Architecture

The Jew's House is built in the local limestone in the Norman or Romanesque style. Dating from the mid-twelfth century, the building originally consisted of a hall at the first floor level, measuring approximately 12 by 6 metres, above service and storage spaces at the ground level.

Part of the original façade survives; the elaborately carved doorway, the remains of two Romanesque double-arch windows and much of the stonework on the upper storey.  A chimney breast rises over the arch above the front door, serving the fireplace on the upper floor. There were once two columns supporting the arch, but these have gone.

See also 
Norman House
Whitefriars, 333 High Street, Lincoln
John of Gaunt's Palace, Lincoln
St Mary's Guildhall, Lincoln

References

Literature
Anon. (1983)  Norman Buildings in Lincoln,  Lincolnshire Museums Information Sheet, Archaeology Series 26. 
Antram N (revised), Pevsner N & Harris J, (1989), The Buildings of England: Lincolnshire, Yale University Press. pg 525.
 M. E. Wood (1974), Revised ed. Norman Domestic Architecture.

External links

British Listed Buildings 
 http://www.jewshouserestaurant.co.uk/

Buildings and structures completed in the 12th century
Houses in Lincolnshire
Buildings and structures in Lincoln, England
Norman architecture in England
Jews and Judaism in England
Grade I listed buildings in Lincolnshire
Grade I listed houses